The second season of the Fire Force anime television series is animated by David Production. It is based on the manga series of the same name written and illustrated by Atsushi Ōkubo. Tatsumi Minakawa replaced Yuki Yase as director of the series. The series aired from July 4 to December 12, 2020.

The first opening theme, "SPARK-AGAIN", is performed by Aimer, while the first ending theme, "ID", is performed by Cider Girl. The second opening theme is "Torch of Liberty", performed by Kana-Boon, while the second ending theme is "Desire", performed by Pelican Fanclub.



Episode list

Home media release

Japanese

English

Notes

References

External links
  
 

Fire Force episode lists
2020 Japanese television seasons